Rosemont is a provincial electoral district in the Montreal region of Quebec, Canada that elects members to the National Assembly of Quebec. It consists of part of the Rosemont–La Petite-Patrie borough of the city of Montreal.

It was created for the 1973 election from parts of Gouin and Jeanne-Mance electoral districts.

In the change from the 2001 to the 2011 electoral map, its territory was unchanged.

Members of the National Assembly

Election results

* Result compared to UFP

References

External links
Information
 Elections Quebec

Election results
 Election results (National Assembly)
 Election results (QuébecPolitique)

Maps
 2011 map (PDF)
 2001 map (Flash)
2001–2011 changes (Flash)
1992–2001 changes (Flash)
 Electoral map of Montreal region 
 Quebec electoral map, 2011 

Provincial electoral districts of Montreal
Rosemont
Rosemont–La Petite-Patrie